Charles R. Condon (1894–1960) was an American screenwriter. He worked on films and a number of serials at a variety of studios including Columbia, Warner Brothers and Universal Pictures.

Selected filmography

 A Dog of the Regiment (1927)
 One-Round Hogan (1927)
 Jaws of Steel (1927)
 What Happened to Father? (1927)
 Five and Ten Cent Annie (1928)
 Caught in the Fog (1928)
 Red Wine (1928)
 A Race for Life (1928)
 Land of the Silver Fox (1928)
 Joy Street (1929)
 Brothers (1930)
 Speed Demon (1932)
 Get That Girl (1932)
 Speed Madness (1932)
 Dangerous Crossroads (1933)
 Soldiers of the Storm (1933)
 The Crime of Helen Stanley (1934)
 The Three Mesquiteers (1936)
 Headline Crasher (1936)
 The Devil Diamond (1937)
 Death in the Air (1937)
 Ten Laps to Go (1938)
 Daredevil Drivers (1938)
 Winners of the West (1940)
 Oklahoma Renegades (1940)
 The Iron Claw (1941)
 Cody of the Pony Express (1950)
 Pirates of the High Seas (1950)

References

Bibliography
 Pitts, Michael R. Poverty Row Studios, 1929–1940: An Illustrated History of 55 Independent Film Companies, with a Filmography for Each. McFarland & Company, 2005.

External links

1894 births
1960 deaths
American screenwriters
People from Chicago